This is a list of mountains in the country of Iran.

By clicking on the symbols at the head of the table the individual columns may be sorted.

References

See also
 List of volcanoes in Iran
 List of Iranian four-thousanders

Iran
Mountains
Iran